Fauono Ken Laban (born 1957) is a New Zealand rugby league footballer, broadcaster and politician.

Biography
Laban grew up in Wainuiomata with his older sister Winnie Laban, who was later a Member of Parliament. His parents, Amy and Ken Snr, came to New Zealand from Samoa in the 1950s. He attended Scots College in Wellington. Straight after leaving school he joined the New Zealand Police, working there for 16 years. He then briefly went into community work before entering broadcasting. In 1990 he became a sports commentator for TVNZ. In 2000 he began commentating rugby on Sky. He married Donna Liddell, a police inspector.

He was a noted rugby league player and played for the Wainuiomata Lions. His final game for the club was their victory in the 1990 Lion Red Cup final, where Wainuiomata beat Otahuhu 34–12, thought to be the first win by a non-Auckland team at Carlaw Park. He later coached rugby league until retiring in 1999.

In 2004 he stood for a seat on the Hutt Valley District Health Board for the Labour Party affiliated Hutt 2020 ticket and was elected. In 2007 he stood for Mayor of Lower Hutt as the Hutt 2020 candidate, but was unsuccessful, in a close three horse race with incumbent David Ogden and city councillor Ray Wallace. From 2010 to 2013 he was elected a member of the Hutt City Council for the Wainuiomata ward serving until 2013 when he instead stood successfully for the Wellington Regional Council. In 2010 he was elected as a trustee of the Hutt Mana Charitable Trust to represent Lower Hutt and became deputy chairman of the trust.

Laban was bestowed with the matai title of Fauono from his mother’s village, Vaiala.

References

1957 births
Living people
People from Lower Hutt
New Zealand sportspeople of Samoan descent
People educated at Scots College, Wellington
New Zealand rugby league players
New Zealand rugby league coaches
New Zealand rugby union commentators
New Zealand sportsperson-politicians
21st-century New Zealand politicians
Hutt City Councillors
Hutt Valley District Health Board members
Wellington regional councillors